The Rio da Onça State Park is a State park in the state of Paraná, Brazil.

Location

It is accessed by PR 412, Balneário Riviera II.
The park has a portal, interpretive trails, suspended bridges, visitor center and belvedere.
Trails start from the visitor center and are well marked and on flat ground, with explanatory signs.
There are bridges over flooded areas. 
The Bromeliads Lookout is the main observation point, where plants, animals, butterflies and bromeliads can be observed.
From the belvedere visitors can view the formation of the tops of the trees.

The park offers environmental programs throughout the year.
The reserve is part of the Lagamar Mosaic:

Environment

The park has dense rainforest vegetation, some of which was present before the park was created, and some from reforestation in the area that used to hold the municipal garbage dump. 
The reforested areas are now in a middle or advanced level of regeneration.
Vegetation includes stands of Tabebuia cassinoides, marshes and restingas.
Flora include Nectandra megapotamica, Ilex theezans, Tapirira guianensis, jacaranda, Crataeva tapia and Clusia criuva.
Fauna include Brazilian guinea pig (Cavia aperea), oncilla (Leopardus tigrinus) and opossums (Didelphis).
25 species of reptiles have been observed and 19 amphibians.

Notes

Sources

State parks of Brazil
Protected areas of Paraná (state)
1984 establishments in Brazil